Franck Barthe is a French mathematician. He was awarded the European Congress of Mathematics (ECM) prize in 2004. He is working as a professor of mathematics at Paul Sabatier University.

Work 

Franck Barthe is known for his reverse form of the Brascamp-Lieb inequality. With Keith M. Ball, Shiri Artstein, and Assaf Naor, he solved Shannon's problem of the monotonic entropy increase of sums of random variables.

Awards 
In 2004, he received the EMS Prize (prize presentation: isoperimetric inequalities, probability measures and convex geometry) for his leading role in the application of mass-theoretical transport techniques.

In 2005, he received the Grand Prix Jacques Herbrand.

References 

Living people
20th-century French mathematicians
Place of birth missing (living people)
21st-century French mathematicians
1972 births
École Normale Supérieure alumni